Ivan Razumović (born 27 Jul 1985) is a  Croatian footballer who played with various clubs in Europe, and had stints overseas in North America and Asia.

Career 
Razumovic began his career in his native Croatia with NK Belišće, and played in the lower German league with FC Konigsbrunn. In 2006, he signed with PFC Vidima-Rakovski Sevlievo of the Bulgarian Second Professional Football League, where he helped team secure a promotion to the Bulgarian A Football Group. In 2008, he returned to Croatia to sign with NK Belišće of the Croatian Second Football League. After the relegation of NK Belisce he went overseas to Canada to sign with Hamilton Croatia of the Canadian Soccer League. He made his debut for the club on May 15, 2010 in a match against TFC Academy. He helped Hamilton finish third in the overall standings, and clinched a postseason berth for the club. In the quarterfinal series against TFC Academy he scored a goal in a 2-1 victory which advanced the club to the semi-finals, and subsequently to the CSL Championship finals. In the finals Hamilton faced Brantford Galaxy, but were defeated by a score of 3-0.

In 2011, he returned to NK Belišće, and the following season he went to Iceland to sign with Ǣgir FC of the 2. deild karla. In 2012, he went overseas to Indonesia to sign with Persiraja Banda Aceh, and the following year he signed with Hong Kong Rangers FC. In 2014, he returned to Europe to sign with Medkila IL, where he appeared in 49 matches and scored two goal.

On 24 February 2017, Razumović signed a contract with Lillehammer FK.

References

External links

Ivan Razumović at HKFA
NFF

1985 births
Living people
Sportspeople from Osijek
Association football defenders
Association football midfielders
Croatian footballers
PFC Vidima-Rakovski Sevlievo players
NK Belišće players
Hamilton Croatia players
Knattspyrnufélagið Ægir players
Persiraja Banda Aceh players
Hong Kong Rangers FC players
Medkila IL (men) players
First Football League (Croatia) players
Canadian Soccer League (1998–present) players
2. deild karla players
Liga 1 (Indonesia) players
Norwegian Third Division players
Norwegian Fourth Division players
Croatian expatriate footballers
Expatriate footballers in Germany
Croatian expatriate sportspeople in Germany
Expatriate footballers in Bulgaria
Croatian expatriate sportspeople in Bulgaria
Expatriate footballers in Iceland
Croatian expatriate sportspeople in Iceland
Expatriate footballers in Indonesia
Croatian expatriate sportspeople in Indonesia
Expatriate footballers in Hong Kong
Croatian expatriate sportspeople in Hong Kong
Expatriate footballers in Norway
Croatian expatriate sportspeople in Norway